Cyrtandra cumingii is a species of flowering plant in the family Gesneriaceae, native to the Philippines. It is very similar in appearance to Cyrtandra yaeyamae.

References

cumingii
Endemic flora of the Philippines
Plants described in 1883
Taxa named by Charles Baron Clarke